Kanagawa 8th district (Kanagawa 8-ku, 神奈川8区) or more formally the "8th district of Kanagawa Prefecture" (Kanagawa-ken dai-8-ku, 神奈川県第8区) is a single-member electoral district for the House of Representatives, the lower house of the National Diet of Japan. It is located in northwestern Yokohama the capital of Kanagawa prefecture. The district covers the wards of Midori and Aoba and after redistricting in 2017, parts of the neighborhoods of Eda and Oomaru in Tsuzuki ward. As of 2021, the district had 427,843 eligible voters.

Before the 2002 redistricting, i.e. until the 2003 general House of Representatives election, the 8th district consisted of Aoba ward and the Miyamae ward of Kawasaki City, the second major city in Kanagawa. Midori had previously been part of the 7th district, Miyamae was transferred to the newly created 18th district.

After the introduction of single-member districts with the 1994 Japanese electoral reform, effective in the 1996 Representatives election, the district was initially won by pre-reform 1st district incumbent Hiroshi Nakada (New Frontier Party later independent), who resigned for his successful campaign in the 2002 mayoral election in Yokohama city and later returned to the House of Representatives, but this time from Hokuriku-Shin'etsu. The resulting special election in Kanagawa 8th district was won by independent Kenji Eda. Eda lost the district in the 2003 Representatives election to Democrat Tetsundo Iwakuni, but won it back in 2005 and has held onto the seat since.

List of representatives

Election results

References 

Kanagawa Prefecture
Districts of the House of Representatives (Japan)